The term Computational visualistics is used for addressing the whole range of investigating  pictures scientifically "in" the computer.

Overview 
Images take a rather prominent place in contemporary life in the western societies. Together with language, they have been connected to human culture from the very beginning. For about one century – after several millennia of written word's dominance – their part is increasing again remarkably. Steps toward a general science of images, which we may call 'general visualistics' in analogy to general linguistics, have only been taken recently. So far, a unique scientific basis for circumscribing and describing the heterogeneous phenomenon "image" in an interpersonally verifiable manner hasstill been missing while distinct aspects falling in the domain of visualistics have predominantly been dealt with in several other disciplines, among them in particular philosophy, psychology, and art history. Last (though not least), important contributions to certain aspects of a new science of images have come from computer science.

In computer science, too, considering pictures evolved originally along several more or less independent questions, which lead to proper sub-disciplines: computer graphics is certainly the most "visible" among them. Only just recently, the effort has been increased to finally form a unique and partially autonomous branch of computer science dedicated to images in general. In analogy to computational linguistics, the artificial expression computational visualistics is used for addressing the whole range of investigating scientifically pictures "in" the computer.

Areas covered
For a science of images within computer science, the abstract data type »image« (or perhaps several such types) stands in the center of interest together with the potential implementations (cf. Schirra 2005). There 
are three main groups of algorithms for that data type to be considered in computational visualistics:

Algorithms from »image« to »image«
In the field called image processing, the focus of attention is formed by the operations that take (at least) one picture (and potentially several secondary parameters that are not images) and relate it to another picture. With these operations, we can define algorithms for improving the quality of images (e.g., contrast reinforcement), and procedures for extracting certain parts of an image (e.g., edge finding) or for stamping out pictorial patterns following a particular Gestalt criterion (e.g., blue screen technique). Compression algorithms for the efficient storing or transmitting of pictorial data also belong into this field.

Algorithms from »image« to "not-image"
Two disciplines share the operations transforming images into non-pictorial data items. The field of pattern recognition is actually not restricted to pictures. But it has performed important precursory work for computational visualistics since the early 1950s in those areas that essentially classify information in given images: the identification of simple geometric Gestalts (e.g., "circular region"), the classification of letters (recognition of handwriting), the "seeing" of spatial objects in the images or even the association of stylistic attributes of the representation. That is, the images are to be associated with instances of a non-pictorial data type forming a description of some of their aspects. The neighboring field of computer vision is the part of AI (artificial intelligence) in which computer scientists try to teach – loosely speaking – computers the ability of visual perception. Therefore, a problem rather belongs to computer vision to the degree to which its goal is "semantic", i.e., the result approximates the human seeing of objects in a picture.

Algorithms from "not-image" to »image«
The investigation of possibilities gained by the operations that result in instances of the data type »image« but take as a starting point instances of non-pictorial data types is performed in particular in computer graphics and information visualization. The former deals with images in the closer sense, i.e., those pictures showing spatial configurations of objects (in the colloquial meaning of 'object') in a more or less naturalistic representation like, e.g., in virtual architecture. The starting point of the picture-generating algorithms in computer graphics is usually a data type that allows us to describe the geometry in three dimensions and the lighting of the scene to be depicted together with the important optical properties of the surfaces considered. Scientists in information visualization are interested in presenting pictorially any other data type, in particular those that consist of non-visual components in a "space" of states: in order to do so, a convention of visual presentation has firstly to be determined – e.g., a code of colors or certain icons. The well-known fractal images (e.g., of the Mandelbrot set) form a borderline case of information visualization since an abstract mathematical property has been visualized.

Computational Visualistics Degree Programmes
The subject of computational visualistics was introduced at the University of Magdeburg, Germany, in the fall of 1996. It was initiated by Thomas Strothotte, Prof. for computer graphics in Magdeburg and largely supported by Jörg Schirra together with a whole team of interdisciplinary researchers from the social and technical sciences as well as from medicine.
This five-year diploma programme has computer science courses as its core: students learn about digital methods and electronic tools for solving picture-related problems. The technological areas of endeavour are complemented by courses on pictures in the humanities. In
addition to learning about the traditional (i.e. not computerized) contexts of using pictures, students intensively practice their communicative skills. As the third component of the program, an application subject such as biology and medicine gives students an early opportunity to apply their knowledge in that they learn the skills needed for co-operating with clients and experts in other fields where digital image data are essential, e.g. microscopy and radiologic image data in biology and medicine. Bachelor and Master's programmes have been introduced in 2006.  

The expression 'computational visualistics' is also used for a similar degree programme of the University at Koblenz-Landau.

References

Further reading 
 Jochen Schneider, Thomas Strothotte & Winfried Marotzki (2003). Computational Visualistics, Media Informatics, and Virtual Communities. Deutscher Universitätsverlag. 
 Jörg R.J. Schirra (1999). "Computational Visualistics: Bridging the Two Cultures in a Multimedia Degree Programme". In: Forum Proceedings, ed.: Z. J. Pudlowski, p. 47–51,   
 Jörg R. J. Schirra (2000). "A New Theme for Educating New Engineers: Computational visualistics". In: Global Journal of Engineering Education, Vol. 4, No. 1, 73–82. (June 2000) 
 Jörg R. J. Schirra (2005). "Foundation of Computational Visualistics". Deutscher Universitätsverlag 
 Jörg R. J. Schirra (2005). "Computational Visualistics: Dealing with Pictures in Computer Science". In: K. Sachs-Hombach (Ed.): Bildwissenschaft zwischen Reflexion und Anwendung. Köln: Herbert von Halem Verlag, 2005, 494–509. 
 Jörg R. J. Schirra (2005) "Ein Disziplinen-Mandala für die Bildwissenschaft - Kleine Provokation zu einem Neuen Fach"". In: Vol. I: Bildwissenschaft als interdisziplinäres Unternehmen. Eine Standortbestimmung. 2005, Köln: Herbert-von-Halem-Verlag
 Bernhard Preim, Dirk Bartz (2007). Visualization in Medicine. Morgan Kaufmann, 2007.
 Bernhard Preim, Charl Botha (2013). Visual Computing for Medicine. Morgan Kaufmann, 2013.

External links 
 Computational visualistics (degree programme at Otto-von-Guericke University Magdeburg, Germany)
 Computervisualistik (degree programme at the University Koblenz-Landau, Germany)
 Project Computational visualistics

visualistics